Mount Roe National Park is a national park in the Great Southern Region of Western Australia. It was designated in 2004, and covers an area of 1278 km2.

Geography
The park covers an area of 1277.26 km2. It is bounded on the north west by Lake Muir National Park, on the west by Mount Frankland North and Mount Frankland National Parks, on the south west by Mount Frankland South National Park, and on the south east by Mount Lindesay National Park.

Mount Roe (357 m) is a large granite outcrop near the western edge of the park. It was named in 1829 by Dr. Thomas Braidwood Wilson after John Septimus Roe, the first Surveyor General of Western Australia.

The Frankland River flows from north to south through the eastern portion of the park. The Kent River flows through the central portion of the park.

Flora and fauna
Plant communities in the park include old-growth jarrah (Eucalyptus marginata) forests, shrublands and heath, and wetlands.

It straddles two ecoregions – the Jarrah-Karri forest and shrublands cover the southern portion of the park and extend to the coast, and Southwest Australia woodlands cover the central and northern portions of the park.

Conservation
The park is part of the Walpole Wilderness Area. It is managed to protect its wilderness values and there are no recreation sites within the park.

References

External link
 Mount Roe National Park, Parks and Wildlife Service, Government of Western Australia.

National parks of Western Australia
Great Southern (Western Australia)
Southwest Australia
Protected areas established in 2004
2004 establishments in Australia